Tim Seeley is an American comic book artist and writer known for his work on books such as Grayson, Nightwing, G.I. Joe: A Real American Hero, G.I. Joe vs. Transformers and New Exiles. He is also the co-creator of the Image Comics titles Hack/Slash and Revival.

Career
Seeley has illustrated a variety of comics, including Kore, G.I. Joe: A Real American Hero, G.I. Joe vs. Transformers, and Forgotten Realms: The Dark Elf Trilogy.

Seeley is also the author of the comic Hack/Slash series, and will participate in the production of the Hack/Slash feature film. It was due to be released by Universal Pictures in 2009.

His Image Comics series, Loaded Bible, gained a great deal of attention for its political theme of Jesus vs. Vampires in a post-apocalyptic Christian-run society.

Seeley's webcomic Colt Noble and the Megalords debuted on Nerd City Online on August 3, 2009. He is currently writing Wild Game, a comic about werewolves.

Seeley shares a studio with fellow comics creator and frequent collaborator Mike Norton.

Selected works

Writer
 G.I. Joe: Frontline #18 (Dec. 2003) Image Comics
 G.I. Joe vs. The Transformers vol. 3 #1-5 (2006) Devil's Due Publishing
 G.I. Joe vs. Transformers vol. 4 #1, 2 (2007) Devil's Due Publishing
 The Occultist ongoing series (2011–2014) Dark Horse Comics
 Lovebunny & Mr. Hell Volume 1 (Image Comics, February 2011)
 Lovebunny & Mr. Hell Secret Origin - Devil's Due Publishing/Image Comics
 Lovebunny & Mr. Hell A Day In The Love Life - Devil's Due Publishing/Image Comics
 Lovebunny & Mr. Hell Savage Love - Devil's Due Publishing/Image Comics
 Lovebunny & Mr. Hell Granny What Big Teeth You Have - Devil's Due Publishing/Image Comics
 Lovebunny & Mr. Hell Ready To Wear - Devil's Due Publishing/Image Comics
 Lovebunny & Mr. Hell Too Much To Dream - Devil's Due Publishing/Image Comics
 Colt Noble & The Mega Lords 44-page one-shot (2009) Independent
 Revival #1-47 (2012–2017) - Image Comics
 Sundowners #1-11 (2014–2015) - Dark Horse Comics 
 Volume 1 (collects #1-6)
 Volume 2 (collects #7-11) 
Batman Eternal (with Scott Snyder, James Tynion IV, Ray Fawkes, Kyle Higgins, and John Layman, 2014–2015) collected as:
 Volume 1 (collects #1-21, tpb, 480 pages, 2014)
 Volume 2 (collects #22-34, tpb, 448 pages, 2015) 
 Volume 3 (collects #35-52, tpb, 424 pages, 2015)
 Nightwing #30, "Setting Son" (with Tom King, Javier Garrón, Jorge Lucas, and Mikel Janin, DC Comics, 2014)
 Grayson #1–17 (DC Comics, July 2014–February 2016)
 Volume 1: Agent of Spyral (hc, 160 pages, 2015) collects:
 "Grayson" (with Tom King and Mikel Janin, in #1, 2014)
 "Gut Feeling" (with Tom King and Mikel Janin, in #2, 2014)
 "The Gun Goes Off" (with Tom King and Mikel Janin, in #3, 2014)
 "The Raid" (with Tom King and Mikel Janin, in #4, 2015)
 Grayson: Future's End #1: "Only A Place For Dying" (with Tom King and Stephen Mooney, one-shot, 2014)
 "The Candidate" (with Tom King and Stephen Mooney, in Secret Origins #8, 2014)
 Volume 2: We All Die At Dawn (tpb, 160 pages, 2016) collects:
 "We All Die at Dawn" (with Tim Seeley and Mikel Janin, in #5, 2015)
 "The Brains of the Operation" (with Tom King and Mikel Janin, in #6, 2015)
 "Sin by Silence" (with Tom King and Stephen Mooney, in #7, 2015)
 "Cross My Heart and Hope to Die" (with Tom King and Mikel Janin, in #8, 2015)
 "A Story of Giants Big and Small" (with Tom King and Stephen Mooney, in Annual #1, 2015)
Batman and Robin Eternal (with Scott Snyder, James Tynion IV, Genevieve Valentine, Ed Brisson, Steve Orlando, Jackson Lanzing and Collin Kelly, 2015–2016) collected as:
 Volume 1 (collects #1-13, tpb, 272 pages, 2016)
 Volume 2 (collects #14-26, tpb, 336 pages, 2016)
 New Suicide Squad #17–21 (with Juan Ferreyra, DC Comics, February–June 2016)
 Nightwing: Rebirth #1 (with Yanick Paquette, July 2016)
 Nightwing vol. 4  #1-20, 22–34 (with Javi Fernandez and Marcus To, DC Comics, July 2016–December 2017)
 Green Lanterns vol. 1  #32–48 (with Ronan Cliquet, DC Comics, October 2017–June 2018)
 Shatterstar  #1–5  (Marvel Comics, October 2018–February 2019)
 Dark Red #1–10 (AfterShock Comics, March 2019–July 2020)
 Bloodshot #1– (Valiant Comics, September 2019– )
 Money Shot – (Vault Comics, October 2019– )
 Vampire: The Masquerade 1– (Vault Comics, August 2020– )

Penciler
 G.I. Joe: A Real American Hero vol. 2 #16, 23–37, 39-43 (2003–2005) Image Comics
 G.I. Joe: America's Elite #19-20 (2007) Devil's Due Publishing
 G.I. Joe: Battle Files #1 (2002) Devil's Due Publishing
 G.I. Joe: Frontline #17 (Nov. 2003) Image Comics
 G.I. Joe Special Missions: Antarctica (Dec. 2006) Devil's Due Publishing
 G.I. Joe Special Missions: Brazil (Apr. 2007) Devil's Due Publishing
 G.I. Joe Special Missions: Manhattan (Feb. 2006) Devil's Due Publishing
 G.I. Joe Special Missions: Tokyo (Sept. 2006) Devil's Due Publishing
 G.I. Joe vs. Transformers vol. 2 #1, 2, 4 (2004) Devil's Due Publishing
 Halloween: 30 Years Of Terror (2008) Devil's Due Publishing, "Repetition Compulsion" segment
 Halloween: Nightdance #1-4 (2007) Devil's Due Publishing
 Lovebunny & Mr.Hell Secret Origin - Devil's Due Publishing/Image Comics
 Lovebunny & Mr.Hell Savage Love - Devil's Due Publishing/Image Comics
 Lovebunny & Mr.Hell Granny What Big Teeth You Have - Devil's Due Publishing/Image Comics
 Lovebunny & Mr.Hell Ready To Wear - Devil's Due Publishing/Image Comics
 Lovebunny & Mr.Hell Too Much To Dream - Devil's Due Publishing/Image Comics
 Jennifer's Body Boom! Studios

Covers
 G.I. Joe: A Real American Hero vol. 2 #14, 19 (2003) Image Comics
 G.I. Joe: America's Elite #11, 16-20 (2006–2007) Devil's Due Publishing
 G.I. Joe: Frontline #17, 18 (2003) Image Comics
 G.I. Joe: Reloaded #10 (Dec. 2004) Image Comics
 G.I. Joe Special Missions: Tokyo (Sept. 2006) Devil's Due Publishing
 G.I. Joe vs. Transformers vol. 2 #1 (2004) Devil's Due Publishing
 G.I. Joe vs. Transformers vol. 3 #1 (2006) Devil's Due Publishing
 G.I. Joe vs. Transformers vol. 4 #1 (2007) Devil's Due Publishing
 Reanimator vol. 1 #1 (2015) Dynamite Comics

References

External links

Year of birth missing (living people)
Living people
American comics artists